Feddea is a genus of flowering plants in the family Asteraceae.

There is only one known species, Feddea cubensis,  endemic to Cuba.

References

Flora of Cuba
Monotypic Asteraceae genera
Asteroideae
Inuleae